This is a list of notable people associated with the University of San Diego, a college located in the United States.

It is limited to those people for whom there is a Wikipedia article, or whose position makes it clear they are unquestionably entitles to an article.

Alumni

References

University of San Diego